Rick Cleveland is an American television writer, playwright, and monologist, best known for writing on the HBO original series Six Feet Under and NBC's The West Wing. His 2011 play The Rail Splitter premiered at Carthage College as the third production of Carthage's annual New Play Initiative. The production also traveled to the Kennedy Center American College Theater Festival (Region 3) in 2012.

Education
Cleveland, a graduate of the Playwrights Workshop at the University of Iowa, is also a founding member of Chicago's American Blues Theater.

Career

Film
Cleveland, Brian Koppelman, David Levien, and Matthew Chapman co-wrote the 2003 film Runaway Jury based on the book by John Grisham. He also wrote a 1998 screenplay for the independent film Jerry and Tom.

Television
In 2000, Cleveland and The West Wing creator Aaron Sorkin won the Emmy Award for Best Writing for a Drama Series their episode "In Excelsis Deo". The episode originally aired during the 1999–2000 season. Cleveland and Sorkin also won the Writers Guild of America Award for best episodic drama at the February 2001 ceremony for "In Excelsis Deo".

Cleveland worked on the HBO original series Six Feet Under throughout the show's five season run. Cleveland joined the crew as a writer and producer for the show's first season in 2001. He wrote the episode "The Trip". He was promoted to supervising producer for the second season in 2002. He wrote two further episodes – "Driving Mr. Mossback" and "The Liar and the Whore". He remained a supervising producer for the third season in 2003. He scripted two more episodes – "Nobody Sleeps" and "Death Works Overtime". He was promoted to co-executive producer for the fourth season in 2004. He wrote two more episodes – "In Case of Rapture" and "Grinding the Corn". He was promoted again to executive producer for the fifth and final season in 2005 and wrote his last episode, "Eat a Peach". He wrote eight episodes in total for the series.

Cleveland won the Jury Award for Best One Person Show at the 2006 US Comedy Arts Festival in Aspen, Colorado for his performance in "My Buddy Bill", about his fictional friendship with President Bill Clinton, a monologue play filmed on June 15, 2007, for a Comedy Central Special and DVD.

He served as writer for the AMC television drama Mad Men for the show's second season in 2008. He was nominated for the Writers Guild of America Award for Best Dramatic Series at the February 2009 ceremony for his work on the second season.

Cleveland recently served as a consulting producer and writer on the Showtime series Nurse Jackie.

Filmography

References

External links

Blog Entries by Rick Cleveland at The Huffington Post
Rick Cleveland at Comedy Central

Primetime Emmy Award winners
Living people
Writers Guild of America Award winners
American television writers
American male television writers
University of Iowa alumni
American television producers
American screenwriters
Year of birth missing (living people)